Victoria Bridge in  County Tyrone, Northern Ireland was served by two adjacent railway stations.

The Londonderry and Enniskillen Railway opened their station on 9 May 1852. It was taken over by the Great Northern Railway (Ireland) in 1883.

Victoria Bridge was the terminus of the Castlederg and Victoria Bridge Tramway, a 7¼ mile long narrow gauge railway linking the GNR(I) main line with the nearby market town of Castlederg. This station opened on 4 July 1884 and closed on 17 April 1933.

Billy Anderson was the last man in charge of Victoria Bridge (GNI) station. Patsy Mc Garrigle served as signalman for the final five years. Victoria Bridge Station was unique because it was constructed from wood and was very beautiful. Now demolished.

The Great Northern Railway (Ireland) station closed on 15 February 1965.

Routes

References

Disused railway stations in County Tyrone
Railway stations opened in 1852
Railway stations closed in 1965
1852 establishments in Ireland
1965 disestablishments in Northern Ireland
Railway stations in Northern Ireland opened in the 19th century